Bertil Berg (19 December 1910 - 25 January 1989) was a Swedish water polo player who competed in the 1936 Summer Olympics. In 1936 he was part of the Swedish team which finished seventh in the water polo tournament. He played all seven matches.

References

1910 births
1989 deaths
Swedish male water polo players
Olympic water polo players of Sweden
Water polo players at the 1936 Summer Olympics